MasterChef Ireland is an RTÉ television cooking game show based on the international format created by Franc Roddam.

As of late 2016 the series has moved to TV3, the fourth season is expected to air as part of the TV3 Autumn 2016 schedule beginning with Celebrity Masterchef Ireland.

Judges

Robin Gill and Daniel Clifford have been confirmed as the new judges on the 2017 season of the show on TV3 Ireland. 
Previous judges included Dylan McGrath and Nick Munier.

Narrator
Lorraine Pilkington was the show's narrator until 2013.
Aoibhéann McCann narrates Celebrity Masterchef Ireland 2017.

Series 1

First series winner

Mary Carney

Series 2
A second season was announced on 15 February 2012. It premiered on 4 October 2012 at 9:30 on RTÉ Two.
The final of the second season aired on 13 December 2012 and was won by Tamarin Blackmur.

Celebrity MasterChef 2013
On 14 July 2013, Celebrity MasterChef Ireland, a new six-part series began on RTÉ One at 9.30pm.
Eight celebrities are taking part with Dylan McGrath and Nick Munier returning as judges.

In week 1 judges Nick Munier and Dylan McGrath asked the contestants to cook something that is 'You on a Plate' and also to cook French dessert Crêpe Suzette in a cooking challenge. Comedian Gary Cooke was the first contestant to leave after Dylan McGrath commented that his dessert looked like something that had "fallen off a roof."
David Gillick was crowned the winner of the competition on the final which aired 18 August 2013, beating fellow finalists, Aengus Mac Grianna and Maia Dunphy.

Celebrities

Celebrity MasterChef 2017
On 16 January 2017, a new series of Celebrity MasterChef Ireland began on TV3 at 10pm.
Daniel Clifford and Robin Gill were the judges.

Celebrities

References

External links
Official website

2011 Irish television series debuts
Irish reality television series
Irish television series based on non-Irish television series
Ireland
RTÉ original programming
Television series by Screentime
Irish television series based on British television series